Moston may refer to:
Moston, Cheshire East, Cheshire, a civil parish west of Sandbach
Moston, Cheshire West and Chester, Cheshire, a civil parish north of Chester
Moston, Manchester, a suburb in the city of Manchester, England
Moston railway station
Moston, Shropshire, a rural hamlet in Shropshire, England
Moston Brook, a stream in Greater Manchester
New Moston, a district in the City of Manchester